Triathlon has been an Olympic sport since its debut at the 2000 Summer Olympics in Sydney, Australia. Its inclusion in the Summer Olympic Games program was the quickest of any sport: the International Triathlon Union (ITU) was founded in 1989 and five years later, on 4 September 1994, triathlon's Olympic status was approved by the 103rd International Olympic Committee Session, in Paris. The variant contested at the Olympics (called Olympic distance) is composed of a  swim, followed by a  bicycle race, and a final  run leg. The distances were chosen based on the resulting format to be a challenge for participants (sprint triathletes as well as endurance competitors) and entertaining for spectators all over the world.

From 2000, the triathlon competition consisted of a men's and a women's event. A third event, the mixed medley relay involving four triathletes each covering the sprint distance, was introduced in 2021. The inaugural women's event was the first to be contested during the Sydney Games, and crowned Swiss triathlete Brigitte McMahon as the first Olympic champion, over the heavy-favorite Australians. The following day, Simon Whitfield of Canada, who was not considered one of the favorites, came from behind and took the men's gold medal with a 200-meter sprint finish. In similar fashion, long-distance specialist Kate Allen of Austria secured the women's Olympic title in 2004. New Zealand placed two male triathletes in the top two, as Hamish Carter and Bevan Docherty won the gold and silver medals, respectively. At the 2008 Summer Olympics, Whitfield was on the verge of repeating his 2000 success, but failed to keep his lead over Jan Frodeno of Germany in the final meters, who pipped the Canadian to the gold medal. The Australian power in women's triathlon was rewarded at the Beijing Games, when three-time world champion and favorite Emma Snowsill clinched the gold medal and Emma Moffatt secured the bronze.

After securing a second career Olympic medal in Beijing, Simon Whitfield (one gold and one silver) and Bevan Docherty (one silver and one bronze) were the only triathletes to have won more than one Olympic medal. In 2016 Alistair Brownlee (twice gold) and Jonathan Brownlee (one silver and one bronce) as well as the first woman, Nicola Spirig Hug (one gold and one silver), joined this circle. In 2021 at the delayed 2020 Summer Olympics. Jonathan Brownlee became the first and, to date only, triathlete to win three medals, and the first to have a full set of gold, silver and bronze.

Men

Individual

Women

Individual

Mixed

Team relay

Statistics

Multiple medalists

Medals by NOC

See also
ITU Triathlon World Championships
ITU Triathlon World Cup

References
General

2000 2004 2008

Specific

Triathlon
Medalists

Olympic